Cissie Winstanley  (née Lithgow, 26 December 1908 – 25 July 2006) was an international lawn bowls competitor for New Zealand.

Bowls career
She won the triples and fours gold medal at the 1973 World Outdoor Bowls Championship in Wellington, New Zealand and also won the gold medal in the team event (Taylor Trophy). Four years later she won a silver medal in the triples at the 1977 World Outdoor Bowls Championship in Worthing, England. An additional bronze medal was won in the team event.

Winstanley won 15 New Zealand National Bowls Championships; (Singles – 1965, 1968, 1973; Pairs – 1957, 1958, 1959, 1965, 1984; Fours – 1958, 1959, 1961, 1963, 1968, 1977, 1978) all when bowling for the Marewa Bowls Club.

Honours and awards
In the 1975 Queen's Birthday Honours, Winstanley was appointed a Member of the Order of the British Empire, for services to bowling. She was inducted into the New Zealand Sport Hall of Fame in 1996.

References

1908 births
2006 deaths
New Zealand female bowls players
Bowls World Champions
New Zealand Members of the Order of the British Empire
People from Egremont, Cumbria
English emigrants to New Zealand
Sportspeople from Cumbria